Joseph Morgan Kendall (May 12, 1863 – November 5, 1933) was an American lawyer and politician who served two terms as a U.S. Representative from Kentucky from 1892 to 1893, then again from 1895 to 1897. He was the son of John Wilkerson Kendall.

Biography 
Born in West Liberty, Kentucky, Kendall received his early education from private tutors and in the public schools.
He attended the State College of Kentucky and the University of Michigan at Ann Arbor.
He was examined by the court of appeals of Kentucky and admitted to the practice of law before he was of age.
He settled in Prestonsburg, Kentucky.

He was appointed to serve as the Clerk of the House of Representatives in the Forty-ninth and Fiftieth Congresses.

Congress 
Kendall was himself elected as a Democrat to the Fifty-second Congress to fill the vacancy caused by the death of his father, Congressman John W. Kendall, and served from April 21, 1892, to March 3, 1893.
He declined to be a candidate for renomination in 1892 due to ill health.
Presented credentials as a Member-elect to the Fifty-fourth Congress and served from March 4, 1895, to February 18, 1897, when he was succeeded by Nathan T. Hopkins, who had contested his election.

Later career and death 
He resumed the practice of law in West Liberty, Kentucky.
He served as delegate to all Democratic State conventions 1884-1933.
He also engaged in agricultural pursuits near Boonsboro, Kentucky.

He died in West Liberty, Kentucky, November 5, 1933.
He was interred in Barber Cemetery.

References

1863 births
1933 deaths
Clerks of the United States House of Representatives
Kentucky lawyers
People from West Liberty, Kentucky
University of Kentucky alumni
University of Michigan alumni
Democratic Party members of the United States House of Representatives from Kentucky